Baengnyeong Island (sometimes spelled Baekryeong) is a ,  long and  wide island in Ongjin County, Incheon, South Korea, located near the Northern Limit Line. The 1953 Korean Armistice Agreement which ended the Korean War specified that the five islands including Baengnyeong Island would remain under United Nations Command and South Korean control. This agreement was signed by both North Korea and the United Nations Command. Since then, it has served as a maritime demarcation between North and South Korea in the Yellow Sea. It has a population of approximately 4,329.

The meaning of its name is "white wing island", since the island resembles a flying ibis with its wings spread.

Given its proximity to North Korea, it has served as a base for intelligence activity by South Korea. Numerous North Korean defectors have also boated here to escape economic and political conditions in their homeland. In the recent past there have been several naval skirmishes between the two countries in the area, and Kim Jong-Un threatened on 11 March 2013 to wipe it out.

Natural monuments of South Korea #391–#393 are located on Baengnyeong Island.

Geography
Baengnyeong Island is the westernmost point of South Korea. Travel time by boat to the island from Incheon is about four hours.

Changsan Cape in Ryongyon, North Korea, can be seen from Baengnyeong on clear days.

Environment
The area is also rich in oceanic fauna and bird diversity. The Chinese egret, which is considered to be one of the fifty rarest birds in the world, can be found here. The area hosts a nature reserve for spotted seals, and they can be observed on the rocks and beaches. Seals occasionally attract predators such as the great white shark into the area. Finless porpoisees in adjacent waters are also curious and playful. The Incheon Coast Guard has been investigating illegal whaling targeting minke whales in the area.

Climate

Religion
Owing to the geographical location, Christianity went through Baengnyeong Island ahead of other Korean regions. After the Gabo Reform, Kim Seong-jin was exiled to this island, and the first church in Korea was established in 1896. There are ten churches on the island at the present time.

Neighboring islands
Two smaller islands nearby are Daecheong Island and the much smaller Socheong Island.

History

Korean War

During the Korean War, the USAF designated the airfield on Paengyong-do as K-53.

The island was defended by the West Coast Island Defense Task Unit composed of men of the 2d Korean Marine Corps Regiment under the direction of US Marines.

In April 1951 Paengyong-do was used as a staging base for a mission to recover wreckage of a downed Mikoyan-Gurevich MiG-15 near the Chongchon River. On 17 April 1951 a USAF Sikorsky H-19 carried a US/South Korean team to the crash site and they photographed the wreck and removed the turbine blades, combustion chamber, exhaust pipe and horizontal stabilizer. The overloaded helicopter then flew the team and samples back to Paengyong-do where they were transferred onto an SA-16 and flown south for evaluation.

The USAF established a communications interception site on the island in mid-1951 which was used to intercept Chinese military communications.

In December 1951 two Sikorsky H-5s of the USAF 3d Air Rescue Squadron were based on the island and would forward deploy daily to Chodo Airport to operate search and rescue missions before being permanently deployed to Chodo in January 1952. The H-5s were later replaced by the more capable Sikorsky H-19, two of which were based at Chodo and one on Paengyong-do.

On 12 November 1952 several aircraft, believed to be Po-2s, bombed the base in a night attack causing minimal damage.

In January 2010, an artillery duel between South Korean ships and North Korean land artillery occurred near Baengnyeong.

March 2010 Baengnyeong incident

The South Korean naval vessel ROKS Cheonan sank near the island on 26 March 2010. The 1,200-ton vessel broke in two pieces, with nearly half the crew dying (mainly in the stern section) and a little more than half surviving (mainly in the bow section). A multinational investigation concluded that a North Korean torpedo struck the ship.

References

Further reading
Malcom and Martz, White Tigers: My Secret War in North Korea, Brassey's. 1996

External links 
 Official site in English
 Official site (in Korean)
 2nd official site (in Korean)
 "Baekryong, an Island Overlooking Jangsan Cape in North Korea"

Islands of Incheon
Islands of the Yellow Sea
Korean War air bases
Ongjin County, Incheon